"Broken, Beat & Scarred" is a song by American heavy metal band Metallica, and the fourth single from their studio album Death Magnetic. It was released on April 3, 2009.

James Hetfield and Lars Ulrich argued at length over the title of this song. Hetfield said that he did not like the title, but Ulrich was "very adamant" that it should be called "Broken, Beat & Scarred".

On April 3, 2009, "Broken, Beat & Scarred" was released as a single in two formats, a digi-collectors edition and a maxi single.

Music video
On March 26, 2009, the official video for "Broken, Beat & Scarred" premiered on the band's official website. The video features the band performing the song live in Fresno, California, in December 2008 accompanied by other clips of the band performing in Ontario, California, in December 2008 on the World Magnetic Tour. It was directed by Wayne Isham, who has previously worked with the band on several videos including Cunning Stunts.

Incorrect credits
The CD maxi single, which was released in Australia, New Zealand, and Southeast Asia, was found to have incorrect information in the credits. The band said that no one from the band or their management had been able to see the artwork before it was released, and it was the fault of the record company. The band said that the singles would be pulled from the stores and another batch was made available. They described the old version as a collector's item for fans who had already bought it.

Track listing

 All live versions recorded at the O2 Arena , London on September 15, 2008, at the Death Magnetic release event.

Personnel
Metallica
 James Hetfield – vocals, rhythm guitar
 Lars Ulrich – drums
 Kirk Hammett – lead guitar
 Robert Trujillo – bass, backing vocals

Other personnel
 Rick Rubin – production

Chart performance

Release details

References

2008 songs
2009 singles
Metallica songs
Music videos directed by Wayne Isham
Song recordings produced by Rick Rubin
Songs written by James Hetfield
Songs written by Kirk Hammett
Songs written by Lars Ulrich
Songs written by Robert Trujillo